Zuopaotai East station is the southern terminal metro station on Line 12 of Shenzhen Metro. It was opened on November 28, 2022.

The station is named after the Left Fort which played a critical role in the defense during the Opium Wars in the 19th century.

Station layout

Exits

References

External Link
Shenzhen Metro Official Page (Chinese)

Railway stations in Shenzhen
Railway stations in Guangdong
Nanshan District, Shenzhen
Railway stations opened in 2022